JAMA Psychiatry (until 2013: Archives of General Psychiatry) is a monthly peer-reviewed medical journal published by the American Medical Association. It covers research in psychiatry, mental health, behavioral sciences, and related fields. The journal was established in 1919 and was split into 2 separate journals in 1959: Archives of Neurology and Archives of General Psychiatry. In 2013, their names changed to JAMA Neurology and JAMA Psychiatry, respectively. The editor-in-chief is Dost Öngür (Harvard University, McLean Hospital).

Abstracting and indexing 
The journal is abstracted and indexed in Index Medicus/MEDLINE/PubMed. According to Journal Citation Reports, the journal has a 2021 impact factor of 25.911, ranking it 3rd out of 157 journals in the category "Psychiatry".

See also
List of American Medical Association journals
List of psychiatry journals

References

External links

Psychiatry journals
Monthly journals
Publications established in 1959
English-language journals
American Medical Association academic journals